The Calliope Range are a small low mountain range in southwestern British Columbia, Canada, located on the western end of Broughton Island and northeast of Port McNeill. It has an area of 15 km2 and is a subrange of the Pacific Ranges which in turn form part of the Coast Mountains.

See also
List of mountain ranges

References

Pacific Ranges
Central Coast of British Columbia